Naseem Ahmed Kharal (June 29, 1939 – July 14, 1978) was a Sindhi short story writer. He was born on June 29, 1939, in Kharalabad, Khairpur District of British India, what subsequently became Pakistan.

Personal life
Son of Abdul Kareem Kharal from District Khairpur, who was a landlord, Naseem was the eldest of all the seven siblings, four brothers and two sisters. He married his cousin, a daughter of Abdul Raheem Kharal, Chief Justice of Khairpur Mir's, and has six children.

He gained a Bachelor of Arts and a law degree and became a landlord. Although a qualified lawyer, he never practiced law and stuck to his roots of agriculture. His work includes  Pahrein Murad, Kafir, 34 dar and his published books are Shabnam Shabnam Kanwal Kanwal (1966), Akhyoon Arsiyoon (1968), Khirnda Khatinhar, Chotihoon Dar (1973) and Dummy.

He died on July 14, 1978 in Khairpur.

See also
 Sindhi literature

References

 Maroo je Malir Ja by Khadim Hussain Chandio
 Quarterly Mehran by Sindhi Adabi Board

Sindhi people
1939 births
1978 deaths
Pakistani male short story writers
Pakistani short story writers
People from Khairpur District
Pakistani landlords
20th-century landowners